Charles Judd was a member of the Wisconsin State Assembly.

Biography
Judd was born on May 11, 1900, in Walworth County, Wisconsin. During World War I, he served in the United States Army. He died on March 16, 1973, and is buried in Mukwonago, Wisconsin.

Political career
Judd was a member of the Assembly from 1939 to 1940. He was a Republican.

References

People from Walworth County, Wisconsin
Republican Party members of the Wisconsin State Assembly
Military personnel from Wisconsin
United States Army soldiers
United States Army personnel of World War I
1900 births
1973 deaths
20th-century American politicians